Michael V. Shunkov is a Russian archaeologist and member of the Russian Academy of Science working at Novosibirsk State University. Shunkov was one of the archaeologists behind the find of a fossilized finger-bone excavated in the Siberian Denisova Cave in the Altai Mountains in 2008 leading up to the 2010 discovery of the Denisova human.

References

Russian archaeologists
Living people
Year of birth missing (living people)
Members of the Russian Academy of Sciences
Academic staff of Novosibirsk State University